CGM48 (read C.G.M. Forty-eight) is a Thai idol girl group. It is the first domestic sister group of the Thai idol group BNK48, and the eighth international sister group of AKB48, after Indonesia's JKT48, China's SNH48 (former),  Thailand's BNK48, Philippines's MNL48, China's AKB48 Team SH,  Taiwan's AKB48 Team TP, and Vietnam's SGO48 (disbanded). The group is named after Chiang Mai, a city in Northern Thailand, where it will be based. The formation of the group was announced at a BNK48 event in Chiang Mai on 2 June 2019. On 10 June 2019, it was announced that BNK48 members Rina Izuta and Punyawee Jungcharoen would be transferred to the group as its manager and leader, respectively. The first audition of the group took place from 15 June to 15 July 2019.

Members

Team C

Trainees

Former members

Discography

Singles

Music video

With others

Movie

References

External links

 

AKB48 Group
Japan–Thailand relations
Musical groups established in 2019
Thai girl groups
Thai pop music groups
2019 establishments in Thailand
2019 in Chiang Mai